The 1963 Australia Cup Final was the second Australia Cup Final, the final match of the 1963 Australia Cup. It was played at Olympic Park Stadium in Melbourne, Australia, on 3 November 1963, contested by Port Melbourne Slavia and Polonia Melbourne. The Final ended in a 0–0 draw with Port Melbourne Slavia winning the replay 3–2, with a hat-trick from Des Palmer.

Route to the final

Port Melbourne Slavia

Port Melbourne Slavia started in the second round where they were drawn with Footscray JUST at home. Slavia won 4–3 from John Auchie, Des Palmer and a double by Tommy Harper. In the quarter-finals, Slavia played against APIA Leichhardt at home where they won 3–1 from Hammy McMeechan, Des Palmer and Tommy Harper. In the semi-finals, Slavia played against Adelaide Juventus where they won 2–0 from Hammy McMeechan and Des Palmer.

Polonia Melbourne

Polonia Melbourne started in the second round also, where they were drawn with George Cross at home. Polonia won 4–3 by penalties after a 0–0 draw. In the quarter-finals, Polonia played against Brisbane Azzurri away where they won 3–0 from Lolly Vella, Edmund Zientara and Michael Jurecki. In the semi-finals, Polonia played against Sydney Praguge where they won 3–1 from Eddie Jankowski, Vic Janczyk, Michael Jurecki.

Match

Details

Final

Replay

References

October 1963 sports events in Australia
November 1963 sports events in Australia
Soccer in Melbourne
Australia Cup (1962–1968) finals